M Udhayakumar (born 1969) is an Indian politician, a Lawyer and Member of Parliament elected from Tamil Nadu. He is elected to the Lok Sabha from Dindigul constituency as an Anna Dravida Munnetra Kazhagam candidate in 2014 election. He is interested in the public service.

In 2014, he was elected to the 16th Lok Sabha with the massive vote counts of 5,12,000 by defeating Gandhirajan S of DMK party in Dindigul constituency.

In 2014, he was a Member of Standing Committee on Personnel, Public Grievances, Law and Justice

In 2014, he was a Member of Consultative Committee, Ministry of Youth Affairs and Sports

In 2006, Udhayakumar was the Vice Chairman of Town Panchayat, Nilakottai.

References 
 

All India Anna Dravida Munnetra Kazhagam politicians
Living people
India MPs 2014–2019
Lok Sabha members from Tamil Nadu
1969 births
People from Dindigul district